Xanthabraxas is a monotypic moth genus in the subfamily Ennominae described by Warren in 1894. Its only species, Xanthabraxas hemionata, described by Achille Guenée in 1857, inhabits northern China.

References

External links

Geometridae